Matsushita (written:  lit. "below the pine tree") is a Japanese surname. Notable people with the surname include:

Daisuke Matsushita (born 1981), a former Japanese football player
Hiro Matsushita (born 1961), former Japanese Champ Car racing driver, businessman and grandson of Konosuke Matsushita. Chairman of Swift Engineering & Swift Xi
, Japanese handball player
Ko Matsushita, a Japanese  conductor  and composer 
Kohei Matsushita (born 1985), a Japanese football (soccer) player currently playing for Ehime F.C.
Konosuke Matsushita (1894–1989), a Japanese industrialist and founder of Matsushita Electric Industrial Co., Ltd., now known as Panasonic Corporation
Masaharu Matsushita (1912–2012), a Japanese businessman, the second president of Matsushita Electric, and son-in-law of Konosuke Matsushita
Miyuki Matsushita (born 1969), a Japanese voice actress
Moeko Matsushita (born 1982), a Japanese singer and actress
Nao Matsushita (born 1985), a Japanese actress and pianist
Nobuharu Matsushita (born 1993), a Japanese racing driver
Sayami Matsushita (born 1982), a Japanese archer 
Shinpei Matsushita (born 1966), a Japanese politician of the Democratic Party of Japan
Susumu Matsushita (born 1950), a Japanese manga artist
Tadahiro Matsushita (born 1949), member of the House of Representatives of Japan
Toshihiro Matsushita (born 1983), a Japanese football (soccer) player currently playing for Albirex Niigata
, Japanese actress
, Japanese footballer
, Japanese swimmer
Yuya Matsushita (born 1990), a Japanese R&B and Hip Hop singer and performer

See also
Matsushita Electric Industrial, now Panasonic Corporation, a multinational electronics corporation based in Kadoma, Japan
Matsushita Electric Works, now Panasonic Electric Works, a lighting, building materials, and appliance manufacturer in Japan
Matsushita Station, a train station on the JR Central Sangū Line in Ise, Mie Prefecture, Japan
Matsushita Whiteline Skip, a compression scheme employed on Panasonic fax machines

Japanese-language surnames